The 1994–95 Esiliiga was divided into two zones, both containing six teams. They all played two games, once at home and once on the road, against each other in their zone to decide the top two who would join with bottom two from Premier Division first phase to create a Premier Division promotion tournament. Other four teams from both zones made up Esiliiga promotion/relegation tournament with four new teams from Second Division first phase. Winners of both groups secured a place in 1995–96 Esiliiga season. Second placed teams in the tournament played each other in the final play-off game to decide who joins the latter two and who is relegated along with other teams that participated in the promotion/relegation phase.

All in all, JK Tulevik Viljandi and JK Vall Tallinn survived the relegation phase and retained their position in the league. FC Arsenal Tallinn was the only team to rise up from the Second Division to play in Esiliiga the next year for the first time. JK Dünamo Tallinn, Tallinna Jalgpallikool and FC Lelle returned to the division, as they all failed to qualify to Meistriliiga. JK Tervis Pärnu was the only successful team to be promoted.

Preliminary round

Northern Zone

Southern Zone

First Division Promotion/relegation Tournament

Northern Zone

Southern Zone

Promotion play-off

See also
 1994–95 Meistriliiga
 1994 in Estonian football
 1995 in Estonian football

Esiliiga seasons
2
2
Estonia